Rig may refer to:

Objects and structures 
 Rig (fishing), an arrangement of items used for fishing
 Drilling rig, a structure housing equipment used to drill or extract oil from underground
 Rig (stage lighting)
 rig, a horse-drawn carriage together with the horses and harness
 rig, something that a dog pulls when mushing
 rig, the configuration of sails and other rigging on a sailing vessel
 rig, a parachute system in skydiving
 rig, a transmitter, receiver, or transceiver in amateur radio

Acronym
 RIG, the ticker symbol for Transocean, a Swiss offshore drilling company
 Radio Independents Group, a UK trade organisation
 Reykjavik International Games, a sport event taking place in Iceland

Places
 Rig, an alternate name for Bandar Rig, a city in Bushehr Province, Iran
 Rig District, a district in Bushehr Province, Iran
 Rig Rural District, a rural district in Chaharmahal and Bakhtiari Province, Iran
 Rig, Gilan, a village in Gilan Province, Iran
 Rig, Jask, a village in Hormozgan Province, Iran
 Rig, Lirdaf, a village in Hormozgan Province, Iran
 Rig castle, in Kashmar County, Iran
 Rig, an alternate name for Rig-e Bala, a village in South Khorasan Province, Iran
 Rig, West Virginia, an unincorporated community in the US
 Pearland Stadium, or The Rig, a stadium in Texas, United States
 Rio Grande Airport, IATA code: RIG, an airport in Brazil

Other uses 
 rig (mathematics) or semiring, a structure similar to rings without the requirement that elements should have additive inverses
 ríg or rí, Irish language word for "king"
 rig or run rig, a traditional system of land occupation in Scotland
 Ridgling, or rig, a male animal with one or both testicles undescended
 rig, to engage in cheating during a game, election, etc.
 Ríg (Norse god) or Heimdall, the father of mankind in Norse mythology
 rigging or skeletal animation, grouping the elements of parts such as limbs in an animated 3D computer model
 Rig (Dead or Alive), a fictional character
 Spotted estuary smooth-hound, a fish
 The Rig (TV series), an upcoming series for Amazon Prime Video
 Gaming rig, a personal computer designed for video games
 RIGS: Mechanized Combat League, a video game

See also
 
 
 Big Rig (disambiguation)
 Rigg (disambiguation)
 Rigger (disambiguation)
 Rigging (disambiguation)
 Riggs, a surname
 Rigveda, in Hinduism, a sacred collection of Vedic Sanskrit hymns dedicated to the gods
 Rigged (book), a 2007 book by author Ben Mezrich